Abram Melato "Fire" Raselemane (23 March 1978, in Thaba Nchu – 27 May 2008, in Bloemfontein) was a South African football striker who last played for Premier Soccer League club Bidvest Wits and South Africa.

Initially rising to prominence in 1999 while playing for Bloemfontein Young Tigers, he later played for Supersport United and Santos Cape Town before joining Wits in 2006.  Between 2002 and 2006, he was capped 15 times by South Africa, scoring 3 goals.

Raselmane died on 27 May 2008 from suicide.

Career statistics

International goals

References

External links

1978 births
2008 suicides
Association football forwards
South African soccer players
South Africa international soccer players
SuperSport United F.C. players
Bidvest Wits F.C. players
Suicides by hanging in South Africa
Santos F.C. (South Africa) players
2005 CONCACAF Gold Cup players